Věra Kotasová (28 May 1939 - 20 April 2019) was a Czech painter and printmaker.

Born in Přerov, Kotasová studied at Palacký University Olomouc from 1957 until 1961; she then joined the institution's faculty, teaching there for many years. Her work is represented in the collection of the National Gallery of Art.

References

1939 births
2019 deaths
Czech women painters
Czech printmakers
Women printmakers
20th-century Czech painters
20th-century printmakers
20th-century Czech women artists
21st-century Czech painters
21st-century printmakers
21st-century Czech women artists
People from Přerov
Palacký University Olomouc alumni
Academic staff of Palacký University Olomouc